Boy Robot is an electronica duo from Berlin, Germany.

Michael Zorn and Hans Möller met in Berlin, both working for Ableton, one coding one marketing the new hope of musicians. Both had been making music before, both were looking for a new direction.

Discography

Albums
 Glamorizing Corporate Lifestyle (2003)
 Rotten Cocktails (2005)

External links
Official website
Boy Robot on Myspace

German musical groups